Casualty 1900s, broadcast in the U.S. as London Hospital, is a British hospital drama inspired by but otherwise unrelated to BBC One drama Casualty.

It places the viewer in the Receiving Room of the London Hospital, in London's East End. The drama is shot with the pace and action of its modern-day counterpart A&E. Every case and character is based on real cases, characters and events taken from the hospital records, nurses' ward diaries, and memoirs.

It began with a single episode of Casualty 1906, followed by three episodes of Casualty 1907, and six episodes of Casualty 1909.

Episodes

Casualty 1907

Episode one
Nurse Ada Russell has to decide whether or not to take the job of Ward Sister of Wellington ward, as it threatens to spoil her engagement to Dr James Walton. The hospital is using a radical new technique, ultra-violet light, to treat skin disease caused by unsanitary living conditions in the East End. Queen Alexandra visits with her sister the dowager empress of Russia to see the hospital.

Episode two
Probationer Ethel Bennett goes through a night of rising tension as she nurses Thomas Hooley, the injured docker whose leg wounds are not healing. She clashes with ward sister Ada Russell, who is overwhelmed by the strain of running of a large, busy ward and worried about her true feelings for her fiancé. Nobby Clark, leader of the violent Blind Beggar Gang, is hospitalised with alcoholic cirrhosis of the liver, aged just 15. Driven mad by cravings and nightmares, his path crosses with Ada with unexpected results.

Episode three
With the hospital facing imminent financial collapse, chairman Sydney Holland launches an inspired campaign to raise money. The cost of building the modern city is revealed when workers on the new Rotherhithe Tunnel are admitted with agonising diver's bends. Ethel, working in the receiving room, contracts scarlet fever from a patient.

Casualty 1909

Episode one
Revolution grips the East End as an explosion brings fears of a bomb, and Ethel Bennett and Dr Millais Culpin struggle to control the angry victims. When detectives arrive, Matron Luckes and Chairman Sydney Holland fear the hospital is in danger of becoming an extension of Scotland Yard. Meanwhile, Sister Ada Russell battles with irascible star surgeon Mr Henry Dean, whose addiction to cocaine is an open secret. And ambitious young Dr Ingrams faces catastrophe in the operating theatre.

Episode two
A scandal brews as Nurse Goodley suspects that Mr Dean is ignoring the terrible side-effects of a new anaesthetic, and battles internally as whether she should risk everything and turn whistleblower. Sister Ada Russell copes with her first day in reception following reassignment. Nurse Bennett fears that her secret alliance with Dr Culpin has been discovered when Matron Luckes sends her into private nursing.

Episode three
The strain of being 'married to the hospital' takes its toll on Sister Ada Russell, as she nears collapse. On one of the London's Jewish wards, Nurse Goodley finds herself increasingly drawn to the charismatic radical Saul Landau – but Saul has a life-threatening illness.

Episode four
Sister Russell discovers the secret of probationer Nellie Bowers when she catches her sneaking out to see a mysterious young man. The London admits a woman brought in wearing pauper's clothes yet with silk underwear underneath. Meanwhile, the brilliant pioneer Dr Henry Head commits to performing a dangerous experiment on himself.

Episode five
Dr Culpin is powerless to help when Ethel Bennett rushes to her dying brother in a naval hospital. Star surgeon Mr Dean faces destruction through his cocaine addiction. Sister Russell breaks the strict rules of Matron Luckes when she sneaks out of the London to help a young mother.

Episode six
All the secrets burst open, as Matron Luckes clashes with Sister Russell for leaving the London to help a family in the slums, while Dr Culpin clashes with Bennett for giving up studying to be a doctor. Mr Dean, supposedly clean, returns to work in the Operating Theatre. In the dead of night a sweatshop catches fire, bringing in scores of injured children, and the staff struggle to avert tragedy.

Medicine as portrayed in Casualty 1900s

Casualty 1900s portrays the use of early anesthesia, predominately chloroform and ether, the first standardised use of spinal anesthesia, and the growing need for trained anesthetists. No electronic equipment means doctors have to physically check a patient's pulse during surgery. CPR is largely based on the Silvester Method in which a patient's arms are raised above their head and then back down in an effort to stimulate muscles.

With penicillin still undiscovered, infections such as Erysipelas are largely incurable. Emphasis is placed on keeping wards and operating theatres clean.

The effectiveness of the anti-streptococcus serum that cures Ethel's scarlet fever was reported in the Journal of the American Medical Association in 1897.

The hospital is shown to have an X-ray room complete with X-ray machine. At the time protection against radiation emitted from such a machine was inadequate, little more than a thick pair of gloves was standard. Earnest Wilson, portrayed by Jason Watkins, was one of Britain's first radiologists and is shown with burns to both hands due to the unsafe levels with which he must work.

Nurse Bennett's dream of becoming a doctor meant facing a challenge, but not an impossibility. Elizabeth Garrett Anderson, the first woman in Great Britain to graduate from medical school, began to practice in 1865. The London School of Medicine for Women was founded in 1874.

Broadcast
Casualty 1907 was broadcast on BBC One. After the initial broadcast of each episode, they were repeated four days afterwards but only in certain areas.

Casualty 1909 was broadcast on Sunday nights through June and July 2009 at 9pm on BBC One and – a first for the Casualty 1900s series – BBC HD. Episodes were repeated on BBC Four a couple of months after their original broadcast.
February 2011 saw the series broadcast on BBC Entertainment in Europe, South Africa, U.A.E & Israel as London Hospital.

DVD release
The complete Casualty 1900s series has been released on Region 2 DVD in the UK. The DVD comprises Casualty 1906, Casualty 1907 and Casualty 1909.

Cast

Casualty 1906

Tim Baker as Begging Boy
Paul Brightwell as Mr. Hills
Nigel Cooke as Dr. Burgess
Dorothy Duffy as Nurse Rafferty
Bella Emberg as Mrs. Hard Up
Nicholas Farrell as Sydney Holland
Ronnie Fox as Policeman
Fiona Gillies as Minnie Piatkov
Colin Heber-Percy as Gould
Rebecca Johnson as Sister Spencer
Hattie Ladbury as Miss Kenneally
Elliot Levey as Abe Goldman
Cherie Lunghi as Matron Eva Luckes
John Maude as Sailor
Tamzin Merchant as Probationer Eastwood
Cathy Murphy as Mrs. Sarah Hills
Connor Quilty as Teddy
Tom Riley as Dr. James Walton
Sarah Smart as Nurse Ada Russell
Hywel Simons as Dr. Lawes
David Troughton as Hurry Fenwick
Katie Ventress as Nurse Mary Green
Jason Watkins as Ernest Wilson
Lyall B. Watson as Hard Up
Antonia Willans as Polly
Mike Lockley as Doctor
Adam Sarath as Patient
Jasmine Lundon as Singing Patient
Joshua Lundon as Singing Patient

Casualty 1907

Alfie Allen as Nobby Clark
Leah Bracknell as Mrs Turner
Nicholas Farrell as Sydney Holland
Neil Fitzmaurice as Thomas Hooley
William Houston as Dr. Millais Culpin
Dominic Jephcott as Bedford Fenwick
Lilli Ella Kelleher as Dora
Lydia Leonard as Laura Goodley
Mike Lockley as Doctor
Cherie Lunghi as Matron Eva Luckes
Jessica Mullins as Maud
Youkti Patel as Corisande Veveers
Tom Riley as Dr. James Walton
Lewis Robinson as Reggie
Hywel Simons as Dr Lawes
Sarah Smart as Ada Russell
Adam Sopp as Frank Gorman
David Troughton as Mr Hurry Fenwick
Charity Wakefield as Ethel Bennet

Casualty 1909

Main characters
 Cherie Lunghi as Matron Eva Luckes
 Sarah Smart as Sister Ada Russell
 Will Houston as Dr Millais Culpin
 Nicholas Farrell as Chairman Sydney Holland
 Charity Wakefield as Nurse Ethel Bennet
 David Troughton as Hurry Fenwick
 Paul Hilton as Henry Percy Dean
 Lydia Leonard as Nurse Laura Goodley
 Tom Hughes as Dr Harry Ingrams
 Anton Lesser as Dr Henry Head
 Tessa Parr as Nellie Bowers
 Andrew Readman as Ernest Morris
 Jo Hartley as Anna
 Rebecca Johnson as Sister Spencer
 Aidan McArdle as Saul Landau
 Imogen Bain as Mrs Anderson
 Eleanor Bron as Miss De Burgh

Supporting characters
 Kenneth Colley as Frederick Smith
 Dorothy Atkinson as Nurse Granger
 Eamon Geoghegan as Hospital Steward
 Aimee-Ffion Edwards as Deborah Lynch
 Kate Fleetwood as Grace Barnes
 Clare Higgins as Mrs Ramsbury
 Amy Stratton as Mrs Tabard
 Jon Lolis as Stepanovs
 John Davies as Uncle Mick
 Grace Cassidy as Teenage Girl
 David de Keyser as Mr Fischoff
 Caroline Harding as Edith Dean
 Lisa Brookes as Nurse Ansett
 Jennie Stoller as Mrs Gold
 Tim Woodward as DSI Hatton
 Christopher Wright as Mr Knopf
 Colin Tierney as Prescott

References

External links
 
 Stone City Films
 

BBC television dramas
2009 British television series debuts
2000s British medical television series
Fiction set in 1906
Fiction set in 1907
Fiction set in 1909
2000s British drama television series
Television series set in the 1900s
Television shows set in London